The Moment of Truth is an album from Latvian band Crow Mother. It was released in April 2017. It is the band's second album. The lead single from the album is "The Moment of Truth".

Track listing 
 "Dirty Van" 03:59 
 "Social Warning" 03:28 
 "One Eyed Ravens" 04:23
 "Perfect Circle" 03:22
 "The Moment of Truth" 03:51
 "Am I Bird" 04:17
 "Bully" 03:40
 "Gray Wolf" 04:37 
 "Chasing the Ghost" 04:00 
 "Black River" 04:44 
 "Demons" 03:08

References

2017 albums